Qatar competed at the 2016 Summer Olympics in Rio de Janeiro, Brazil, from 5 to 21 August 2016. This was the nation's ninth consecutive appearance at the Summer Olympics.

The Qatar Olympic Committee (QOC) sent the nation's largest ever delegation to the Games. A total of 38 athletes, 36 men and 2 women, were selected to the Qatari team across ten different sports, roughly more than a triple of its full roster size at London 2012. Twenty-three of them were born outside Qatar, including eleven handball players, two boxers, a table tennis player, and a beach volleyballer. In addition to three aforementioned sports, Qatar marked its Olympic debut in equestrian jumping and judo, as well as its return to weightlifting after 12 years.

The Qatari team was highlighted by two of its prominent athletes and Olympic bronze medalists from the previous Games: high jumper and current Asian record holder Mutaz Essa Barshim, and skeet shooter Nasser Al-Attiyah, who attended his sixth Games as the oldest and most experienced competitor (aged 45). Other notable athletes on the Qatari delegation also included Asia's fastest sprinter Femi Ogunode, table tennis legend Li Ping, freestyle swimmer Nada Arkaji, and equestrian rider Sheikh Ali Al-Thani, who eventually served as the nation's flag bearer in the opening ceremony.

Qatar left Rio de Janeiro with a historic silver-medal feat by Barshim, upgrading his bronze from London four years earlier. Meanwhile, Al-Thani and hammer thrower Ashraf Amgad Elseify narrowly missed out of the podium to join with Barshim on the nation's medal tally, finishing among the top six in their respective sporting events.

Medalists

| width="78%" align="left" valign="top" |

| width="22%" align="left" valign="top" |

| width="22%" align="left" valign="top" |

Athletics

Qatari athletes have so far achieved qualifying standards in the following athletics events (up to a maximum of 3 athletes in each event):

Track & road events

Field events

Boxing

Qatar has entered two boxers to compete in each of the following weight classes into the Olympic boxing tournament, signifying the nation's debut in the sport. Turkish-born Hakan Erşeker had claimed his Olympic place as a quarterfinalist losing to the eventual champion Enrico Lacruz of the Netherlands at the 2016 AIBA World Qualifying Tournament in Baku, Azerbaijan. Meanwhile, light welterweight boxer Thulasi Tharumalingam secured an additional place on the Qatari roster with his semifinal triumph at the 2016 APB and WSB Olympic Qualifier in Vargas, Venezuela.

Equestrian

Qatar has entered a team of four jumping riders into the Olympic equestrian competition with a first-place finish at the 2015 FEI Nations Cup Series in Abu Dhabi, United Arab Emirates, signifying the nation's debut in the sport.

Jumping

"#" indicates that the score of this rider does not count in the team competition, since only the best three results of a team are counted.

Handball

Summary

Men's tournament

Qatar men's handball team qualified for the Olympics by winning the title and securing a lone outright berth at the 2015 Asian Qualification Tournament in Doha, signifying the nation's debut in the sport.

Team roster

Group play

Quarterfinal

Judo

Qatar has qualified one judoka for the men's lightweight category (73 kg) at the Games, signifying the nation's debut in the sport. Morad Zemouri earned a continental quota spot from the Asian region, as Qatar's top-ranked judoka outside a direct qualifying position in the IJF World Ranking List of May 30, 2016.

Shooting

Qatari shooters have achieved quota places for the following events by virtue of their best finishes at the 2015 ISSF World Cup series, and Asian Championships, as long as they obtained a minimum qualifying score (MQS) as of March 31, 2016.

Swimming

Qatar has received a Universality invitation from FINA to send two swimmers (one male and one female) to the Olympics.

Table tennis

Qatar has entered one athlete into the table tennis competition at the Games. Chinese import Li Ping secured the Olympic spot in the men's singles as the highest-ranked table tennis player coming from the West Asia zone at the Asian Qualification Tournament in Hong Kong.

Volleyball

Beach
Qatar men's beach volleyball team qualified directly for the Olympics by winning the final match over China at the AVC Continental Cup in Cairns, Australia, signifying the nation's debut in the sport.

Weightlifting

Qatar has received an unused quota place from IWF to send a male weightlifter to the Olympics, signifying the nation's comeback to the sport for the first time since 2004.

References

External links 

 

Olympics
Nations at the 2016 Summer Olympics
2016